Mohamed Lamine Diarra (born 20 June 1992) is a Guinean professional footballer who plays as a defensive midfielder. He is a former Guinea international.

Club career
Born in Conakry, Guinea, Diarra began his professional career at Paris Saint-Germain, signing in 2009 at the age of 16. He captained youth sides and the reserve team of the club before leaving for Danish Superliga team Odense on a four year contract in 2012.

To take him through to the end of the 2016/17 season following his release from Odense, Diarra signed a short-term contract with Nykøbing on 4 October 2016 playing in the final two games of the season with the club.

On 1 February 2017, Diarra signed a one-year contract with Altai Semey in the Kazakhstan Premier League, however after Altai Semey were denied their place in the Kazakhstan Premier League, Diarra joined Taraz and completed the season in December making 31 league appearances for the club.

In March 2018 Diarra returned to Denmark to join superliga promotion hopefuls Vendsyssel. On 27 May 2018, Diarra helped Vendsyssel FF achieve promotion to the Danish superliga following their 3-1 aggregate play-off victory over Lyngby.

Career statistics

Club

International

Statistics accurate as of match played 12 October 2015

International goals 
Scores and results list Guinea's goal tally first.

Honours 
Paris Saint-Germain U19

 Championnat National U19: 2010–11

References

External links

1992 births
Living people
Association football midfielders
Guinean footballers
French footballers
Guinea international footballers
French sportspeople of Guinean descent
Black French sportspeople
Paris Saint-Germain F.C. players
Odense Boldklub players
Nykøbing FC players
FC Altai Semey players
FC Taraz players
Vendsyssel FF players
Hvidovre IF players
Championnat National 2 players
Danish Superliga players
Danish 1st Division players
Kazakhstan Premier League players
2015 Africa Cup of Nations players

Guinean expatriate footballers
Expatriate men's footballers in Denmark
Expatriate footballers in Kazakhstan
Guinean expatriate sportspeople in Denmark
Guinean expatriate sportspeople in Kazakhstan